Richard Sukuta-Pasu (born 24 June 1990) is a German professional footballer who plays as a forward for Vejle Boldklub.

Club career
Sukuta-Pasu began his career in summer 1998 in his hometown Wuppertal with Grün-Weiß Wuppertal and was scouted by Bundesliga club Bayer Leverkusen in June 2000. He played for Bayer in several youth teams and was promoted to the reserve team in summer 2008. Since October 2008 he was also part of the Bayer's Bundesliga squad and earned his first four Bundesliga caps during the 2008–09 season. In December 2009, he was loaned to 2. Bundesliga club FC St. Pauli until 30 June 2011.

He made his debut for St. Pauli on 16 January 2010 by coming off the bench to score with his second touch in the 88th minute of the match against Rot Weiss Ahlen. After leaving St. Pauli in June 2011, he has spells with 1. FC Kaiserslautern, Sturm Graz and VfL Bochum. In summer 2014, Sukuta-Pasu transferred to Belgian Cercle Brugge. After only a year with Cercle, he returned to Germany joining 3. Liga side Energie Cottbus on a free transfer, signing a contract until 2017.

In May 2018, MSV Duisburg announced Sukuta-Pasu would join from SV Sandhausen for the 2018–19 season having agreed a two-year contract until 2020.

On 25 February 2019, Sukuta-Pasu transferred to China League One club Guangdong South China Tiger.

On 29 January 2020, Sukuta-Pasu joined K League 2 club Seoul E-Land FC.

Sukuta-Pasu returned to Germany in October 2021, joining 3. Liga club SV Meppen. He signed a two-year contract. On 22 June 2022 it was confirmed, that Sukuta-Pasu had signed with newly relegated Danish 1st Division club Vejle Boldklub, penning a deal until June 2024.

International career
Sukuta-Pasu played at the 2008 European U-19 championships, where he scored three goals, including the winner in the final against Italy, and the 2007 U-17 World Cup.

Personal life
He is son to a Congolese father and a French mother. Fellow professional footballer Wilson Kamavuaka is his second cousin.

Career statistics

References

External links
 
 
 
 

1990 births
Living people
Sportspeople from Wuppertal
German footballers
Footballers from North Rhine-Westphalia
Association football forwards
Germany youth international footballers
Germany under-21 international footballers
Bundesliga players
2. Bundesliga players
3. Liga players
Regionalliga players
Austrian Football Bundesliga players
Belgian Pro League players
China League One players
K League 2 players
Bayer 04 Leverkusen players
Bayer 04 Leverkusen II players
FC St. Pauli players
1. FC Kaiserslautern players
1. FC Kaiserslautern II players
SK Sturm Graz players
VfL Bochum players
Cercle Brugge K.S.V. players
FC Energie Cottbus players
SV Sandhausen players
MSV Duisburg players
Guangdong South China Tiger F.C. players
Seoul E-Land FC players
Richard Sukuta-Pasu
SV Meppen players
Vejle Boldklub players
German people of French descent
German sportspeople of Democratic Republic of the Congo descent
German expatriate footballers
German expatriate sportspeople in Austria
Expatriate footballers in Austria
German expatriate sportspeople in Belgium
Expatriate footballers in Belgium
German expatriate sportspeople in China
Expatriate footballers in China
German expatriate sportspeople in South Korea
Expatriate footballers in South Korea
German expatriate sportspeople in Thailand
Expatriate footballers in Thailand